John Brown I (January 27, 1736September 20, 1803) was an American merchant, politician and slave trader from Providence, Rhode Island. Together with his brothers Nicholas, Joseph and Moses, John was instrumental in founding Brown University (then known as the College of Rhode Island) and moving it to their family's former estate in Providence. 

John Brown laid the cornerstone of the university's oldest building in 1770, and he served as its treasurer for 21 years, from 1775 to 1796. Brown was one of the founders of Providence Bank and became its first president in 1791. He was active in the American Revolution, notably as an instigator of the 1772 Gaspee Affair, and he served in both state and national government. At the same time, he was a powerful defender of slavery, clashing aggressively in newspapers, courts and the political system with his brother Moses, who had become an abolitionist. 

John Brown's home in Providence is now a museum and National Historic Landmark. Brown's desk and bookcase reside at the Yale University Art Gallery in New Haven, Connecticut. The desk is attributed to Daniel Spencer, who opened his cabinetmaking studio in Providence, Rhode Island in 1772.

Early life

John Brown was born in Providence in the Colony of Rhode Island and Providence Plantations, on January 27, 1736, to James Brown II (1698–1739) and Hope Power (1702–1792). His paternal grandparents were Elder James Brown (1666–1716), a pastor at the First Baptist Church, and Mary (Harris) Brown. His father, James Brown II, established himself early in the mercantile business, trading in slaves, rum, molasses, and other goods. His parents, who were married in 1723, had six children, including: Mary Brown (1731–1795), who married Dr. David Vanderlight, James Brown III (1724–1750), the eldest son who was a sea captain and who died young, Nicholas Brown (1729–1791), Joseph Brown (1733–1785), John Brown (1736–1803) and Moses Brown (1738–1836).

Family

John Brown was a descendant of Chad Brown, a co-founder of Providence and early Baptist minister at the First Baptist Church in America following Roger Williams. His uncle was Obadiah Brown I (1712–1762), who joined Brown's father, James Brown II (1698–1739), in the mercantile trade in cocoa, rum, molasses. He also enslaved and sold men, women and children of African descent. Obadiah's initial role was as master of his brother's shipping vessels in the West Indies trade. After the death of Brown's father in 1739, Obadiah retired from the sea himself, but continued the business. He also helped to raise James' young children, later forming a partnership with James' four surviving sons as "Obadiah Brown & Co." Obadiah Brown I, who married his first cousin, Mary Harris (1718–1805), daughter of Toleration and Sarah Harris, had eight children. All four of their sons died in early childhood, and their four daughters, Brown's first cousins, were Phebe Brown (born 1738), who married John Fenner (brother of Governor Arthur Fenner), Sarah Brown (1742–1800), who married Lt. Gov. Jabez Bowen (1739–1815), Anna Brown (1744–1773), who married her first cousin, Moses Brown, and Mary Brown (born 1753), who married Thomas Arnold (1751–1826). Another uncle was Rhode Island Deputy Governor Elisha Brown and a nephew was Nicholas Brown Jr., the philanthropist and the namesake of Brown University.

Career

Brown went on to own a successful farming and shipping business with his brothers, Nicholas, Joseph, and Moses Brown. He was active in the slave trade and China trade and invested heavily in privateers during the 1760s through 1780s.

Brown was a leader in the Sons of Liberty and was one of the instigators of the burning of the Gaspee in 1772. Along with the Boston Tea Party, this was one of the first violent acts of defiance to the authority of the British Crown which eventually led up to the American Revolution.

In 1775, during the American Revolution, John Brown sold the United States Navy its first ship, the USS Providence (previously, the Katy). Brown was named as a delegate for Rhode Island to the Continental Congress in 1784–1785 but did not attend.

Slave trading

John Brown was also a slave trader and personally owned slaves as well. On March 22, 1794, Congress passed the Slave Trade Act of 1794, which prohibited the making, loading, outfitting, equipping, or dispatching of any ship to be used in human trafficking. Subsequently, on August 5, 1797, John Brown was ordered to forfeit his ship . He was tried in federal court as the first American to be tried under the 1794 law. Brown was acquitted, but did not have his ship returned.

Brown's involvement in the slave trade and slavery in Rhode Island are addressed in the official Response of Brown University to the Report of the Steering Committee on Slavery and Justice.

Business interests
Brown's business interests were varied. In addition to the slave trade he was involved in shipbuilding and real estate speculation. He was also a partner (along with his brother Moses Brown and Rhode Island Governor Stephen Hopkins) in the Hope Furnace (located in Hope Village on the border of towns of Scituate and Coventry, RI) which made cannons during the American Revolution and through the War of 1812.

In 1791 Brown founded Providence Bank - the first bank in Rhode Island, and organizer of the Providence South Bridge Company. After various acquisitions over the next 160 years Providence Bank evolved into FleetBoston Financial which, in turn, was absorbed by Bank of America in 2004. Providence Bank is one of the oldest "branches" in Bank of America's "family tree" and is, at least arguably, still a "living" corporate entity.

The original Providence Bank building still stands at 50 South Main Street in Providence and is the corporate office of the Brown & Ives Land Company which is another business which can trace its roots to John Brown.

American revolution

John Brown played a leading role in the Gaspée Affair of 1772 that increased hostilities between the thirteen colonies and the British Empire and helped catalyze events leading up to the American Revolutionary War. He was an active Federalist and pushed against Rhode Island's anti-federalist, "Country Party" in getting Rhode Island to become part of federal union.

Providence, the first warship to sail for America's Continental Navy, was built in 1768 by John Brown. It was purchased by the colony of Rhode Island after British men-of-war began attacking Rhode Island's shipping lanes. The General Assembly ordered its committee of safety to fit out two ships to defend the lanes, one of which became the Providence. The ship—at one time under the command of John Paul Jones, considered the father of the American Navy—went on to participate in 60 battles and to capture 40 British ships before it was dismantled in 1779 to prevent it from falling into the hands of the British.

Political activity

Brown was elected to the United States House of Representatives in 1798 and served one two-year term from March 4, 1799, to March 3, 1801. The carriage he travelled to Washington in is referred to as "John Brown's chariot" and is preserved at the John Brown House in Providence.

Death and burial

John Brown died in Providence, Rhode Island on September 20, 1803, and interred in the Brown family plot in the North Burial Ground in Providence.

Personal life
He was married to Sarah (Smith) Brown (1738–1825). Together, they had:

 James Brown III (1761–1834) from Rhode Island, who never married, was educated at Harvard University where he graduated in 1780. In 1789, James was elected a member of the Board of Fellows of Brown University, and regularly attended meetings until his death.
 Abigail Brown Francis
 Sarah Brown Herreshoff (1773–1846), who married Charles Frederick Herreshoff (1763–1819), an engineer derived from Germany.
 Alice Brown Mason

Descendants
Brown's grandson John Brown Francis was later a U.S. Senator and Governor of Rhode Island. His grandson, Charles Frederick Herreshoff (1809–1888), and his sons, James Brown Herreshoff (1834–1930), John Brown Herreshoff (1841–1914), and Nathanael Greene Herreshoff (1848–1938) founded the Herreshoff Manufacturing Company, a boat-building establishment in Bristol, Rhode Island.

See also

 John Brown House
 Elkanah Watson

References

Further reading
 Charles Rappleye, Sons of Providence: The Brown Brothers, the Slave Trade, and the American Revolution (Simon & Schuster, New York, 2006).
 Bangs, Jeremy D, "The Travels of Elkanah Watson" (McFarland & Company, 2015).

External links
 
 Encyclopedia Brunoniana
 Biography of James Brown and catalog of original manuscripts held by the Rhode Island Historical Society
 Biographical notes on John Brown by the Gaspee Virtual Archives
 Final report and other materials from Brown University's Steering Committee on Slavery and Justice reflecting on the university's historical relationship to slavery (including through John Brown and his family)
 Providence Journal (2006) article on the conflict between John and Moses Brown, from a series on Rhode Island's Slave History.
 John Brown's Mansion
	
	

1736 births
1803 deaths
Politicians from Providence, Rhode Island
American people of English descent
Brown University people
American slave traders
People of colonial Rhode Island
University and college founders
Patriots in the American Revolution
People of Rhode Island in the American Revolution
American Revolutionary War prisoners of war held by Great Britain
American proslavery activists
Baptists from Rhode Island
John Brown I
Burials in Rhode Island
Federalist Party members of the United States House of Representatives from Rhode Island
American slave owners
Colonial American merchants